Future: Tense: The Coming World Order is a 2004 book by Canadian journalist and author Gwynne Dyer.  In it he examines the motivations and consequences of the 2003 U.S. invasion and subsequent occupation of Iraq.

Arguments

In his book, Dyer makes the argument that:
the U.S. "neo-conservative agenda" included the invasion of a country as a demonstration of U.S. military power and a new willingness to operate in defiance of international co-operation and the UN;
Iraq was chosen because it was an unpopular government engaged in human rights violations and obstruction in implementing U.N. resolutions, and that therefore an invasion would elicit a minimum of antipathy from the world;
Iraq was also chosen because, while it was a potential long-term threat, the invasion would be low-risk as it was considered unlikely that Iraq possessed usable weapons of mass destruction;
oil was not a motivating factor, as military occupation is not the most cost-effective way to obtain oil;
undermining the UN's role in international security will result in the kind of security situation that existed in 1914;
the United States does not have the military assets or economic base to sustain a self-appointed role as the world's 'judge, jury and executioner';

His conclusion is that embarking on a mission of world domination without the ability to sustain it in the long term will lead to a dangerous increase in the chances of a world war.

Online resources
Full text available at Internet Archive

Iraq–United States relations
2004 books
Works by Gwynne Dyer